Walter Braden "Jack" Finney (born John Finney; October 2, 1911 – November 14, 1995) was an American writer.  His best-known works are science fiction and thrillers, including The Body Snatchers and Time and Again. The former was the basis for the 1956 film Invasion of the Body Snatchers and its remakes.

Personal life
Finney was born in Milwaukee, Wisconsin, and given the name John Finney. After his father died when Finney was three years old, he was renamed Walter Braden Finney in honor of his father, but continued to be known as "Jack". He attended Knox College in Galesburg, Illinois, graduating in 1934. He married Marguerite Guest, and they had two children, Kenneth and Marguerite. After living in New York City and working for an advertising agency there, he moved with his family to California in the early 1950s. He lived in Mill Valley, California, and died of pneumonia and emphysema in Greenbrae, California, at the age of 84.

Writing career 
Finney's first article, "Someone Who Knows Told Me …", published in the December 1943 issue of Cosmopolitan, reflects the message of the Office of War Information's (OWI) "Loose Lips Sink Ships" campaign of World War II. As an advertising copywriter, Finney was doing his part, driving home the point that careless remarks by otherwise patriotic citizens can aid enemy agents, resulting in the death of US servicemen.

His story "The Widow's Walk" won a contest sponsored by Ellery Queen's Mystery Magazine in 1946.  His first novel, 5 Against the House, was published in 1954.  It was made into a movie the following year.

Finney's novel The Body Snatchers (1955) was the basis for the 1956 movie Invasion of the Body Snatchers and multiple remakes.

Another novel, Assault on a Queen (1959), became the film Assault on a Queen with Frank Sinatra as the leader of a gang that pulls a daring robbery of the RMS Queen Mary.

Finney's greatest success came with his science fiction novel Time and Again (1970). It involves time travel to the past, a theme he had experimented with previously in short stories. Its protagonist, Simon Morley, is working in advertising in New York City when he is recruited for a secret government project to achieve time travel. Morley travels to the New York City of 1882. The novel is notable for Finney's vivid and detailed picture of life in the city at that time and for the art and photographs supposedly made by Morley during his experiences, which are reproduced in the pages of the novel. Morley sees many actual historical sites, some now gone (e.g., the post office that, until 1939, stood in what is now the southern tip of City Hall Park) and some still existing (e.g., St. Patrick's Cathedral, then the tallest building in its Fifth Avenue neighborhood).

In 1987, Finney was given the World Fantasy Award for Life Achievement at the World Fantasy Convention, held in Nashville, Tennessee.

Finney's story "Such Interesting Neighbors" (Collier's, 6 January 1951) was the basis for the second episode of Science Fiction Theatre, entitled "Time Is Just a Place". It was first broadcast on 16 April 1955. It co-starred Don DeFore and Warren Stevens; it was then published in 1957, in the collection The Third Level by Rhinehart and Company; later, the story appeared as an episode of the Steven Spielberg-created anthology series Amazing Stories, starring Adam Ant and Marcia Strassman. Spielberg's version was first broadcast on 20 March 1987.

In 1995, twenty-five years after Time and Again, Finney published a sequel called From Time to Time featuring the further adventures of Morley, this time centering on Manhattan in 1912.  Finney died at the age of 84 not long after finishing the book.

The 1998 television movie The Love Letter, starring Campbell Scott and Jennifer Jason Leigh, is based on Finney's short story of the same name, which appeared in The Saturday Evening Post in 1959.

The Third Level, Knox College's science fiction and fantasy publication, is named for Finney's short story "The Third Level", published in The Magazine of Fantasy & Science Fiction in October 1952.

Works

Short stories
 "Someone Who Knows Told Me …", Cosmopolitan (Non-Fiction) (December 1943)
 "The Widow's Walk", Ellery Queen's Mystery Magazine (July 1947)
 "Manhattan Idyl", Collier's (April 1947)
 "I'm Mad at You", Collier's (December 1947)
 "Breakfast in Bed", Collier's (May 1948)
 "It Wouldn't Be Fair", Collier's (August 1948) - Also published in Ellery Queen's Mystery Magazine
 "You Haven't Changed a Bit", Colliers (April 1949)
 "The Little Courtesies", Collier's (June 1949)
 "A Dash of Spring", Cosmopolitan (June 1949)
 "Week-end Genius", Colliers (May 1950)
 "I Like It This Way", Collier's (June 1950)
 "My Cigarette Loves Your Cigarette", Collier's (September 1950)
 "Such Interesting Neighbors", Collier's (January 1951)
 "One Man Show", Collier's (June 1951)
 "I'm Scared", Collier's (September 1951)
 "It Wouldn't be Fair", Ellery Queen's Mystery Magazine (November 1951)
 "Obituary" (co-written with C.J. Durban), Collier's (February 1952)
 "The Third Level", The Magazine of Fantasy & Science Fiction (October 1952)
 "Quit Zoomin' Those Hands Through the Air", The Magazine of Fantasy & Science Fiction (December 1952)
 "Of Missing Persons" (1955)
 "Man of Confidence", Good Housekeeping (September 1955)
 "Second Chance", Good Housekeeping (April 1956)
 "Contents of the Dead Man's Pocket", Good Housekeeping (June 1956)
 "The Love Letter", Saturday Evening Post (August 1, 1959) [Also re-published in January/February 1988 issue of Saturday Evening Post]
 "The U-19’s Last Kill", Saturday Evening Post (six-part series, beginning August 22, 1959, and ending September 26, 1959)
 "The Other Wife" (also known as "The Coin Collector"),  Saturday Evening Post (January 30, 1960)
 "An Old Tune" (also known as "Home Alone"), McCall's (October 1961)
 "Old Enough for Love", McCall's (May 1962)
 "The Sunny Side of the Street", McCall's (October 1962)
 "Time Has No Boundaries" (also known as "The Face in the Photo"), Saturday Evening Post (October 13, 1962)
 "Hey, Look at Me!" (1962)
 "Lunch Hour Magic" (1962)
 "Where the Cluetts Are" (1962)

Novels
Several Finney novels were adapted as feature films; see below.
 5 Against the House (1954) 
 The Body Snatchers (1955) 
 The House of Numbers (1957) 
 Assault on a Queen (1959) 
 Good Neighbor Sam (1963)
 The Woodrow Wilson Dime (1968)
 Time and Again (1970)
 Marion's Wall (1973)
 The Night People (1977)
 From Time to Time (1995) – sequel to Time and Again

Collections
 The Third Level (1957), short story collection, in England as The Clock of Time (1958)
 I Love Galesburg in the Springtime (1963), short story collection
 Forgotten News: The Crime of the Century and Other Lost Stories (1983), nonfiction
 About Time (1986), short story collection, a subset of only the time stories from The Third Level and I Love Galesburg in the Springtime
 Three by Finney (1987), an omnibus edition of The Woodrow Wilson Dime, Marion's Wall, and The Night People

Plays
 Telephone Roulette: A Comedy in One Act (1956)
 This Winter's Hobby: A Play (1966)

Film adaptations 
 5 Against the House (1955 Phil Karlson film starring Guy Madison, Kim Novak, and Brian Keith)
 Invasion of the Body Snatchers (1956 Don Siegel film starring Kevin McCarthy, Dana Wynter and Larry Gates)
 House of Numbers (1957 Russell Rouse film noir starring Jack Palance)
 Good Neighbor Sam (1964 David Swift film starring Jack Lemmon, Romy Schneider, and Dorothy Provine)
 Assault on a Queen (1966 Jack Donohue film based on The U-19's Last Kill starring Frank Sinatra, Virna Lisi, and Anthony Franciosa)
 Invasion of the Body Snatchers (1978 remake by Philip Kaufman starring Donald Sutherland, Brooke Adams, Jeff Goldblum, and Leonard Nimoy)
 Maxie (1985 Paul Aaron film starring Glenn Close, Mandy Patinkin, and Ruth Gordon; based on Marion's Wall)
 Body Snatchers (1993 remake of Invasion of the Body Snatchers)
 The Love Letter (1998 Dan Curtis TV movie starring Campbell Scott, Jennifer Jason Leigh, David Dukes, and Estelle Parsons; based on the story of the same name)
 The Invasion (2007 remake of Invasion of the Body Snatchers starring Nicole Kidman and Daniel Craig)
 Crayon Shin-chan: The Legend Called: Dance! Amigo! (2006 Shin-Ei Animation film starring Akiko Yajima, Miki Narahashi, Keiji Fujiwara, Akeno Watanabe; based on Yoshito Usui's original manga that was inspired by The Body Snatchers)

References

External links 

 
 Biography at The Encyclopedia of Science Fiction
 
 
  Obituary.
 [Obituaries from Pittsburgh Post-Gazette, San Francisco Examiner, Dayton Daily News, and The New York Times]
  Academic journal article on time-slip in science fiction, with special reference to Time and Again and The Love Letter.
  An appreciation of Jack Finney on the 100th anniversary of his birth.
  Annotated bibliography with other materials.
 The Dell Paperback Collection at the Library of Congress has first edition paperbacks of Finney's works.

1911 births
1995 deaths
20th-century American novelists
American male novelists
American science fiction writers
American thriller writers
Deaths from emphysema
Knox College (Illinois) alumni
People from Mill Valley, California
World Fantasy Award-winning writers
Writers from Milwaukee
Writers from the San Francisco Bay Area
American male short story writers
20th-century American short story writers
20th-century American male writers
Novelists from California
Novelists from Wisconsin